Kim Il-sung died of a sudden heart attack on the early morning of 8 July 1994 at age 82. North Korea's government did not report the death for more than 34 hours after it occurred. An official mourning period was declared from 8–17 July, during which the national flag was flown at half mast throughout the country, and all forms of amusement and dancing were prohibited.

Radio Pyongyang reported that Kim had died from a stroke. In the years prior to his death, he had been receiving treatment for diabetes as well as the hardening of arteries in his heart. His son Kim Jong-il was announced as North Korea's next leader with the title of "The Great Successor" that same day marked the start of North Korea becoming the world's first communist dynasty. Seventeen years later, he died on 17 December 2011 of the same cause of death as his father and Jong-il's demise was announced two days later.

Background

On the late morning just before 12:00 noon of 7 July 1994, Kim Il-sung collapsed at his residence in Hyangsan from a sudden heart attack. After the heart attack, his son Kim Jong-il ordered the team of doctors who were constantly at his father's side to leave, and arranged for the country's best doctors to be flown in from Pyongyang. After several hours, the doctors from Pyongyang arrived, but despite their efforts to save him, Kim Il-sung died at around 2:00 am local time on 8 July 1994. His death was declared 34 hours later, respecting the traditional Confucian mourning period.

The announcement of the death of the supreme leader was made live over Korean Central Television at noon by the channel's news presenter Chon Hyong-kyu on 9 July 1994.

Kim Il-sung's death resulted in nationwide mourning and a ten-day mourning period was declared by Kim Jong-il. His funeral in Pyongyang was attended by hundreds of thousands of people from all over North Korea. Kim Il-sung's body was placed in a public mausoleum at the Kumsusan Memorial Palace, where his preserved and embalmed body lies under a glass coffin for viewing purposes. His head rests on a Korean-style pillow and he is covered by the flag of the Workers' Party of Korea. Newsreel video of the funeral at Pyongyang was broadcast on several networks, and now can be found on various websites. A further mourning period lasted until the third anniversary of his death in 1997.

Reactions

Korean Peninsula

North Korea – On 9 July, Korean Central News Agency said that North Koreans "firmly resolve to remain loyal to the guidance of the Dear Leader Kim Jong-il". The agency described the so-called Dear Leader as "the reliable heir of Great Leader Kim Il-sung's revolutionary accomplishments". In another broadcast, Kim was described as the "inheritor of North Korea's revolution and the chief of revolutionary forces". On 11 July Japanese public television NHK said that North Korea's government completely blocked people and vehicles from passing through Tumen City, situated at the foot of the Tumen River, on the China–North Korea border, where border trade is actively taking place.

International reactions
Russia – President Boris Yeltsin did not send condolences due to the two nations' strained relations at that period, instead delegating the duty to the then-Prime Minister Viktor Chernomyrdin.
United States – President Bill Clinton expressed his hope that the talks "will continue as appropriate". Clinton said: "I extend sincere condolences to the people of North Korea on the death of President Kim Il-sung. We appreciate his leadership in resuming the talks between our governments."

Funeral service

Kim Jong-il was chairman of the funeral committee. The committee also included Defense Minister O Jin-u, and Vice President Kim Yong-ju, who was Kim Il-sung's younger brother.

The funeral committee released communique regarding the funeral:

The state funeral was scheduled to be held on 17 July but was delayed until 19 July. It included the observance of three minutes of silence throughout the country. Attendance to the funeral was two million people.

Funeral committee
The funeral committee was chaired by Kim Jong-il and had 273 members, including:

 Kim Jong-il
 O Jin-u
 Kang Song-san
 Ri Jong-ok
 Pak Song-chol
 Kim Yong-ju
 Kim Pyong-sik
 Kim Yong-nam
 Choe Kwang
 Kye Ung-thae
 Jon Pyong-ho
 Han Song-ryong
 So Yun-sok
 Kim Chang-man
 Choe Thae-bok
 Choe Yong-rim
 Hong Song-nam
 Kang Hui-won
 Yang Hyong-sop
 Hong Sok-hyong
 Yon Hyong-muk
 Ri Son-il
 Kim Chol-su
 Kim Ki-nam
 Kim Kuk-thae
 Hwang Jang-yop
 Kim Pok-sin
 Kim Chang-ju
 Kim Yun-hyok
 Jang Chol
 Kong Jin-tae
 Yun Ki-bok
 Pak Nam-gi
 Jon Mun-sop
 Yu Mi-yong
 Hyon Jun-kuk
 Won Tong-ku
 Ri Ha-il
 Kim Ik-hyon
 Ri Chang-son
 O Kuk-ryol
 Kwon Hui-kyong
 Kang Sok-sung
 Choe Hui-jong
 No Myong-kwon
 Jong Ha-chol
 Kim Tu-nam
 Paek Hak-rim
 Chi Chang-ik
 Ri Yong-u
 Ri Chi-chang
 Choe Pok-hyon
 Kim Chang-o
 Ri Sok-paek
 Pak Yong-sop
 Ri Chol-pong
 Jong Jun-ki
 Hwang Sun-hui
 Sin Sang-kyun
 Jong Ha-chol
 Kim Ki-ryong
 Kang Hyon-su
 Pak Sung-kil
 Kim Hak-chol
 Paek Pom-su
 Choe Mun-son
 Im Hyong-ku
 Ri Kun-mo
 Hyon Chol-kyu
 Ri Kil-song
 Im Su-man
 Ri Ul-sol
 Kim Pong-ryul
 Kim Kwang-sin
 Kim Jong-gak
 O Ryong-pang
 Kim Myong-kuk
 O Yun-hwi
 Kim Pyok-sik
 Jang Song-u
 Jon Jin-su
 Chu Sang-jong
 Kim Yong-chul
 Cho Myong-rok
 Kim Il-chol
 Paek Chang-sik
 Kim Yong-hun
 Kang Tong-yun
 Pak Chi-su
 Han In-chol
 Kim Ha-kyu
 Nam Sang-nak
 Hyon Chol-hae
 Ri Pong-won
 Kim Pyong-yul
 Chu Song-il
 Choe Yong-hae
 Choe Song-suk
 Kim Song-ae
 Paek In-jun
 Ri Mong-ho
 Mun Song-sul
 Yom Ki-sun
 Ri Yong-chol
 Jang Song-paek
 Kim Si-hak

See also
Death and state funeral of Kim Jong-il
Kim Il-sung bibliography
List of largest funerals
List of things named after Kim Il-sung

References

Further reading

External links
On the occasion of the 23rd anniversary of the death of Kim Il-sung at Naenara

1994 in North Korea
Kim, Il-sung
History of the Workers' Party of Korea
Kim Il-sung
Kim, Il-sung
Kim, Il-sung
20th century in Pyongyang
July 1994 events in Asia